
Year 867 (DCCCLXVII) was a common year starting on Wednesday (link will display the full calendar) of the Julian calendar.

Events 
 By place 

 Byzantine Empire 
 September 23 – Emperor Michael III is murdered, by order of his co-emperor Basil I. Basil becomes sole ruler (basileus) of the Byzantine Empire, and founds the Macedonian Dynasty (until 1056). Basil rebuilds the Byzantine army and navy, in an effort to restore the empire.

 Europe 
 August – Treaty of Compiègne: King Charles the Bald cedes the Cotentin Peninsula to Salomon, duke ('king') of Brittany, after he had sent his son-in-law Pascweten to negotiate a peace. Charles orders the fortification of the cities of Tours, Le Mans and Compiègne.
 Bořivoj I declares himself duke (knyaz) of Bohemia, and founds the Přemyslid Dynasty (approximate date).

 Britain 
  Vikings or "Danes" (the two terms were often used interchangeably at the time), comprising the Great Heathen Army, advance northward from bases in the Kingdom of East Anglia, into the Anglo-Saxon Kingdom of Northumbria.
 Deira, the southernmost part of Northumbria, is conquered by the Vikings. Ivar the Boneless, one of their leaders, installs a puppet king of Northumbria, Ecgberht I.
 The rival monarchs of Northumbria, Ælla and Osberht, join forces in an attempt to expel  the Great Heathen Army, but are defeated in battle by Ivar the Boneless and Halfdan Ragnarsson. Osberht is killed in battle, while Ælla is reportedly captured, before being subject to the blood eagle: a combined method of torture and execution.
 Surviving members of the Northumbrian court flee into the northernmost part of the kingdom, Bernicia.

 By topic 

 Religion 
 The Council of Constantinople is held (presided over by Patriarch Photius), which anathematizes the use of the Filioque clause in the Creed, and also Pope Nicholas I, for his attacks on the work of Greek missionaries in Bulgaria.
 September – Photius I ("the Great"), patriarch of Constantinople, is removed from office and banished. Ignatius is reinstated as patriarch by Basil I.
 November 13 – Pope Nicholas I dies after a 9-year reign. He is succeeded by Adrian II (also referred to as Hadrian II), as the 106th pope of Rome.

Births 
 October 10 – Li Siyuan, emperor of Later Tang (d. 933)
 Gyeon Hwon, king of Hubaekje (Korea) (d. 936)
 Pribislav, prince (knyaz) of Serbia (approximate date)
 Stephen I, patriarch of Constantinople (d. 893)
 Zhao Zong, emperor of the Tang Dynasty (d. 904)
 Zhu Jin, Chinese warlord (d. 918)

Deaths 
 March 21 – Ælla, king of Northumbria
 March 21 – Osberht, king of Northumbria
 November 13 – Nicholas I, pope of the Catholic Church
 Auisle, Viking leader (approximate date)
 Cormac mac Connmhach, Irish monk and scribe
 Donnchad mac Aedacain, king of Uisneach (Ireland)
 Eahlstan, bishop of Sherborne 
 Fujiwara no Yoshimi, Japanese nobleman (b. 813)
 Fujiwara no Yoshisuke, Japanese statesman (b. 813)
 Galindo Aznárez I, count of Aragon
 Gottschalk of Orbais, German monk and theologian
 Lazarus Zographos, Byzantine monk and painter
 Louis, Frankish archchancellor and abbot  
 Michael III, emperor of the Byzantine Empire (b. 840)
 Muhammad ibn Abdallah, Abbasid governor
 Qarin I, ruler (spahbed) of the Bavand Dynasty
 Wasif al-Turki, Abbasid general
 Wulfsige, bishop of Lichfield

References